Philip or Phil Lewis may refer to:

Philip D. Lewis (1924–2017), Canadian politician who served in the federal Senate, 1978–1999
Philip J. Lewis (1900–1985), lawyer and politician in Newfoundland
Phil Henderson (writer) (born 1967), aka Philip Lewis, American novelist, illustrator, essayist, and poet
Phil Lewis (musician) (born 1957), English vocalist for the American band L.A. Guns
Phil Lewis (baseball) (1883–1959), professional baseball player
Phil Lewis (cricketer) (born 1981), English cricketer
Phill Lewis (born 1968), American actor
Phillip Harold Lewis (1922–2011), American anthropologist and museologist
Philip H. Lewis Jr. (1925–2017), professor of landscape architecture

See also

Philip Louis (disambiguation)